Sydney Michelle Schneider (born 31 August 1999) is a professional footballer who plays as a goalkeeper for Czech Women's First League club Sparta Prague. Born in the United States, she represents the Jamaica women's national team.

Early life
Schneider was born and raised in the Dayton section of South Brunswick, New Jersey, to Andrea (formerly Schneider, née Wisdom) and David Kapinos (stepfather). She attended South Brunswick High School.

UNC Wilmington
In February 2017, Schneider signed a letter of intent to join the UNC Wilmington Seahawks. In her freshman year she started all 19 games, becoming only the second goalkeeper in school history to play every minute in a season. Schneider was also named the Colonial Athletic Association (CAA) Goalkeeper-of-the-Year in 2019.

Professional career 
She was drafted 29th overall by Washington Spirit in the 2021 NWSL Draft. In January 2023, Schneider signed with Sparta Prague of the Czech Women's First League.

International career
Schneider qualified to play for the United States (her birthplace and her mother's), Germany (her biological father's birthplace) or Jamaica (her maternal grandparents' birthplace). She turned down the chance to play the Jamaica U-17 team in 2015 but accepted in 2016 and represented Jamaica at the 2016 CONCACAF Women's U-17 Championship.

At the 2018 CONCACAF Women's U-20 Championship Schneider played all three group games for Jamaica. They finished last in their group and did not qualify for the knockout round.

Schneider was named to the Jamaican squad for the 2018 CONCACAF Women's Championship. In their second group match against Costa Rica, Schneider was named player of the match as she made some key saves, helping Jamaica secure an upset 1–0 victory over the 34th ranked team.

Schneider was chosen by coach Hue Menzies as the first choice in Jamaica's goal at the 2019 FIFA Women's World Cup. In her debut against Brazil, she saved a penalty kick and had a prominent participation during the match, despite having lost it by 0–3.

Personal life
Schneider comes from a multicultural family. Her biological father, Ernie, is German; her mother, Andrea, was born in the United States to a Jamaican-born father, and a Jamaican mother; and her stepfather David is of Greek descent.

References

External links 
 Sydney Schneider - Women's Soccer
 

1999 births
Living people
Citizens of Jamaica through descent
Jamaican women's footballers
Women's association football goalkeepers
Jamaica women's international footballers
2019 FIFA Women's World Cup players
Pan American Games competitors for Jamaica
Footballers at the 2019 Pan American Games
Jamaican people of German descent
Jamaican people of American descent
People from South Brunswick, New Jersey
Sportspeople from Middlesex County, New Jersey
Soccer players from New Jersey
American women's soccer players
South Brunswick High School (New Jersey) alumni
UNC Wilmington Seahawks women's soccer players
Washington Spirit draft picks
Washington Spirit players
American people of German descent
American sportspeople of Jamaican descent
African-American women's soccer players
21st-century African-American sportspeople
21st-century African-American women
AC Sparta Praha (women) players
Expatriate women's footballers in the Czech Republic
American expatriate sportspeople in the Czech Republic
Czech Women's First League players